The rough-footed mud turtle (Kinosternon hirtipes)  is a species of mud turtle in the family Kinosternidae. The species is endemic to the southwestern United States and northern Mexico.

Geographic range
K. hirtipes is found in the United States in Texas, and it is also found in Mexico in the Mexican states: Aguascalientes, Chihuahua, Coahuila, Mexico DF, Durango, Guanajuato, Jalisco, Mexico State, Michoacán, Morelos, and Zacatecas.

Diet 
As omnivores, the diet of K. hirtipes primarily consists of vegetation and insects including filamentous algae, seeds and fruits, aquatic, terrestrial, flying arthropods, as well as aquatic gastropods. K. hirtipes undergoes a dietary shift from insects to vegetation as body size increases which facilitates rapid growth. Although male K. hirtipes are larger in size than females, both sexes share a dietary overlap consuming similar foods.

Predation 
Based on tracks around kill sites, bite marks and shell damage it has been determined that the main predators of the K. hirtipes are racoons and feral pigs. Not surprisingly, both racoons and pigs are known to hunt several other species of turtle. These turtles seem to be relatively "immune" to predation but are at the highest risk when coming out of the water to nest.

Subspecies
Five subspecies of Kinosternon hirtipes are recognized as being valid, including the nominotypical subspecies.
Valley of Mexico mud turtle – Kinosternon hirtipes hirtipes 
Lake Chapala mud turtle – Kinosternon hirtipes chapalaense 
San Juanico mud turtle – Kinosternon hirtipes magdalense 
Viesca mud turtle – Kinosternon hirtipes megacephalum  (Extinct)
Mexican Plateau mud turtle – Kinosternon hirtipes murrayi 
Patzcuarco mud turtle – Kinosternon hirtipes tarascense

Etymology
The subspecific name, murrayi, is in honor of American zoologist Leo Tildon Murray (1902–1958).

References

External links
Wagler J (1830). Natürliches System der Amphibien, mit vorangehender Classification der Säugthiere und Vögel. Ein Beitrag zur vergleichenden Zoologie. Munich: J.G. Cotta. vi + 354 pp. (Cinosternon [sic] hirtipes, new species, p. 137). (in German and Latin). .

Kinosternon
Turtles of North America
Reptiles of Mexico
Reptiles of the United States
Fauna of the Chihuahuan Desert
Natural history of Aguascalientes
Natural history of Chihuahua (state)
Natural history of Coahuila
Natural history of Durango
Natural history of Guanajuato
Natural history of Jalisco
Natural history of the State of Mexico
Natural history of Michoacán
Natural history of Morelos
Natural history of Texas
Natural history of Zacatecas
Least concern biota of North America
Reptiles described in 1830